The Jehovahcoat Demos is an album by Julian Cope, released in 2011. It is technically Cope's twenty-sixth solo album, and the mostly instrumental album contains 15 previously unreleased tracks, written and recorded by Cope throughout 1993 in direct response to having been dropped by Island Records in October 1992.

The album derives its title from Cope collaborator, multi-instrumentalist Donald Ross Skinner, who, throughout the post-Island Records period, constantly referred to wearing his imaginary 'Jehovahcoat'. This being - according to Skinner - the ultimate Julian Cope promo item.

Track listing 

 Note

"Julian the Apostate" is an adaptation of the unreleased song "Hollow Call" by the short lived British band Drop (1978–79).

Personnel
Musicians
Julian Cope 
 Donald Ross Skinner
Mark "Rooster" Cosby (credited as "Biff Rooster Biff")
Shaun Harvey

Technical
Julian Cope - producer, photography
Shaun Harvey, Donald Ross Skinner, Tim Lewis - engineer
Adam Whittaker - mastering
Holy McGrail - design

References

2011 compilation albums
Julian Cope albums